The Lotus 49 was a Formula One racing car designed by Colin Chapman and Maurice Philippe for the 1967 F1 season. It was designed around the Cosworth DFV engine that would power most of the Formula One grid through the 1970s. It was one of the first F1 cars to use a stressed member engine combined with a monocoque to reduce weight, with other teams adopting the concept after its success. It also pioneered the use of aerofoils to generate downforce.

Jim Clark won on the car's debut, in 1967, and it would also provide him with the last win of his career, in 1968. Graham Hill went on to win that year's title and the car continued winning races until 1970.

Concept
After a difficult first year for Lotus in the three-litre formula using the heavy and unreliable BRM H16 engine, Chapman went back to the drawing board and came up with a design that was both back to basics and forward-thinking. Taking inspiration from earlier designs, particularly the Lotus 43 and Lotus 38 Indycar, the 49 was the first F1 car to be powered by the Ford Cosworth DFV engine, after Chapman convinced Ford to build an F1 power-plant.

The 49 was an advanced design in Formula 1 because of its chassis configuration. The specially-designed engine became a stress-bearing structural member (seen earlier with the H16 engine in the Lotus 43 and BRM P83, and prior to that in the front-engined Lancia D50 of 1954), bolted to the monocoque at one end and the suspension and gearbox at the other. Since then, virtually all Formula 1 cars have been built this way.

The 49 was a testbed for several new pieces of racecar technology and presentation. Lotus was the first team to use aerofoil wings, which were introduced at the 1968 Monaco Grand Prix. Originally these wings were bolted directly to the suspension and were supported by slender struts. The wings were mounted several feet above the chassis of the car for effective use in clean air, however after several breakages which led to dangerous accidents, the high wings were banned and Lotus was forced to mount the wings  directly to the bodywork.

Racing history

In testing, Graham Hill found the Lotus 49 easy to drive and responsive, but the power of the Ford engine difficult to handle at first. The V8 would give sudden bursts of power that Hill had reservations about. After his first run in the car, he said in typical witty fashion, 'It's got some poke! Not a bad old tool.' Jim Clark won with ease driving the 49 in its debut race at Zandvoort, and took another three wins during the season, although early unreliability with the DFV ended his championship hopes. The 49 had problems in its first race for Hill, and it had spark plug trouble at the 1967 Belgian Grand Prix, held on the 8.76 mile (14.73 kilometer) Spa-Francorchamps.

Clark and Hill fell victim to its reliability issues at the French Grand Prix, held at the Le Mans Bugatti Circuit (a smaller circuit using only part of the track used for the Le Mans 24 Hours), and lost to Jack Brabham. Clark then ran out of fuel at Monza during the Italian Grand Prix.  Mechanical failures cost Lotus the championship that year, but it was felt that 1968 would be a better year after Cosworth and Lotus perfected their designs, which were clearly the way forward.

Clark won the first race of the 1968 season, the South African Grand Prix and the Tasman Series in Australia, but was killed in an F2 race at Hockenheim. Hill took over as team leader and won his second World Championship title, after clinching three Grand Prix wins - including the fourth of his five Monaco Grands Prix. Jo Siffert also drove a 49, owned by Rob Walker, to win the British Grand Prix at Brands Hatch that year, the last time a car entered by a genuine privateer won a championship Formula 1 race. The 49 also took Jochen Rindt to his first victory, in 1969, at Watkins Glen, New York, before he drove the type to its last win, in the 1970 Monaco Grand Prix.

The 49 was intended to be replaced by the Lotus 63 midway through 1969, but when that car proved to be a failure, an improved version of the 49, the 49C, was pressed into service until a suitable car could be built.  The 49 took twelve wins and contributed to two drivers' and constructors' world championships, before it was replaced by the Lotus 72 during 1970. The final appearances of the 49C were in 1971, with Wilson Fittipaldi finishing ninth in the 1971 Argentine Grand Prix, and Tony Trimmer finishing sixth in the Spring Cup at Oulton Park.

Of the twelve 49s built, seven remain. Chassis R3 (driven by Hill, then sold to privateer John Love) is the only example of the original 1967 cars still in existence, and is on display at the National Motor Museum in Hampshire.

Complete Formula One results

Championship results 
(key) (results in bold indicate pole position; results in italics indicate fastest lap)

 Points were awarded on a 9-6-4-3-2-1 basis to the first six finishers at each round, but only the best placed car for each make was eligible to score points. The best five results from the first six rounds and the best four results from the last five rounds were retained in 1967 and 1969, five from the first six and five from the last six in 1968, and the best six results from the first seven rounds and the best five from the last six rounds were retained in 1970.
 Formula Two cars occupied fifth to tenth positions in the 1969 German Grand Prix, but were not eligible for championship points. The points for fifth and sixth were awarded to the drivers of the eleventh and twelfth placed cars.
 Total points scored by all Lotus-Ford cars, including 45 points scored by drivers of Lotus 72 variants.

Non-Championship results 
(key) (results in bold indicate pole position; results in italics indicate fastest lap)

Racing colours

From its introduction in 1967 works Lotus 49s were painted in Lotus's traditional British racing green with yellow centre-stripe. Over the following 16 months the design gained increasing numbers of sponsor patches and large driver name strips, while retaining the traditional base scheme. However, for the 1967-1968 Tasman Series races Team Lotus's 2.5 litre engined 49s were painted red, cream and gold — the colours of Gold Leaf cigarettes — after Chapman signed a lucrative sponsorship deal. This colour scheme was introduced for the  World Championship at the second race of the season, the 1968 Spanish Grand Prix, making Lotus the first works team (second only to Team Gunston entering a private Brabham car at the 1968 South African Grand Prix) to paint their cars in the livery of their sponsors.

Lotus 49s were also run by the Scottish privateer Rob Walker Racing Team, who painted their car in the Scottish national racing colours (dark blue with white nose band), and the American privateer Pete Lovely team, whose car (chassis R11) was painted in the American national racing colours of white with a blue centre-stripe.

Gallery

References

Footnotes
 Total points scored by all Lotus-Ford cars, including 45 points scored by drivers of Lotus 72 variants.

Sources
Race results drawn from ChicaneF1.com, Formula1.com and GEL Motorsport Information.

Further reading

External links

49
Tasman Series cars
Formula One championship-winning cars